Marc Ganzi is an American businessman. He is the President and CEO of DigitalBridge, and is the founder and former CEO of Digital Bridge Holdings and Global Tower Partners. He is also a polo player.

Early life
He received a Bachelor of Science in business administration from the Wharton School of the University of Pennsylvania. He interned in the White House for Stephen M. Studdert, special advisor to President George H. W. Bush in 1989.  In 1990, Ganzi served as an assistant Commercial Attaché in Madrid for the U.S. Department of Commerce’s Foreign Commercial Service Department.

Career
After graduation, Ganzi bought distressed real estate for Resolution Trust Corporation.

He worked at Deutsche Bank, where he oversaw investments in the radio tower sector.

In 1993, he co-founded AD Development Corporation, a real estate development company in the Mid-Atlantic states, where he worked until 1994. He co-founded Apex Site Management, which was purchased by SpectraSite, and he served as group president for a year. In 1998, Ganzi founded Eureka Broadband, an application service provider and high-speed Internet access corporation. From 2000 to 2002, he was a partner in DB Capital Partners in New York City.

In 2003, he founded Global Tower Partners, a telecommunications company headquartered in Boca Raton, Florida. He served as its Chief Executive Officer and built the company into the largest privately held operator of U.S. cell towers. The company was purchased by Macquarie Group in 2007, and, in 2013, American Tower Corporation acquired GTP for $4.8 billion.

In 2013, Ganzi and Ben Jenkins founded Digital Bridge Holdings, an investor and operator of mobile and internet connectivity companies. Digital Bridge Holdings was acquired by Colony Capital in 2019, where Ganzi took over as CEO-elect. On July 1, 2020, he became CEO and President of Colony Capital. In 2021, the company rebranded to become DigitalBridge, a digital infrastructure investment firm, and he remained in those respective positions.

Polo
He is a one-goal polo player. He also owns the Grand Champions Polo Club in Wellington, Florida.

In 2009, together with Facundo Pieres, Gonzalo Pieres and Nicolas Pieres on the Audi team, he won the U.S. Open Polo Championship. The same year, he also competed in the 2009 Miami Beach Polo World Cup in Miami Beach, Florida.

On May 15, 2013, he played with Prince Harry at the Sentebale Royal Salute Polo Cup at the Greenwich Polo Club in Greenwich, Connecticut, a charity match to raise US$1 million for Sentebale. On July 28, 2013, his Equus & Co team, together with Polito Pieres, Nic Roldan and Mike Azzaro, lost the Westchester Cup.

Personal life
He is married to Melissa Ganzi, who is also a polo player. She has played polo with Prince William, Duke of Cambridge and Charles, Prince of Wales. They have two children together, son Grant and daughter Riley, who are also polo players. They reside in Wellington, Florida.

References

Living people
20th-century births
Year of birth missing (living people)
People from Wellington, Florida
Wharton School of the University of Pennsylvania alumni
American technology chief executives
American polo players